The following table includes the 30 tallest world islands located in a lake or reservoir. These lake islands are ranked by their topographic prominence, their maximum elevation above the surrounding water level.

All geographic coordinates are adjusted to the World Geodetic System of 1984 (WGS 84). North American topographic elevations are adjusted to the North American Vertical Datum of 1988 (NAVD 88). Use the OpenStreetMap link below to view the location of the high points of these tallest lake islands.

Tallest lake islands

See also

List of elevation extremes by country
List of elevation extremes by region
List of U.S. states and territories by elevation
Lists of islands
List of islands by area
List of islands by highest point
List of islands by name
List of islands by population
Recursive islands and lakes
River island

Notes

References

External links

Islands
Lists of extreme points
Lists of highest points
Lists of islands